Richard Lee (born 11 September 1944) is an English former professional footballer who played in the Football League for Halifax Town and Mansfield Town.

References

1944 births
Living people
English footballers
Association football defenders
English Football League players
Rotherham United F.C. players
Notts County F.C. players
Mansfield Town F.C. players
Halifax Town A.F.C. players
Buxton F.C. players
Mossley A.F.C. players